Anthony Gerard Stubblefield (born March 28, 1970) is an American college basketball coach who is the head men's basketball coach at DePaul University. He was previously an assistant for University of Oregon, University of Cincinnati and New Mexico State University, where he also served as interim head coach during the 2004–2005 season due to Lou Henson's illness.

Playing career
Stubblefield starred at Broomfield (Colorado) High School and played two seasons at Clinton Community College in Iowa before transferring to Nebraska–Omaha for his final two years of eligibility. He'd serve as team captain his senior season.

Coaching career
Following graduation, Stubblefield has served as an assistant coach at Omaha, Texas–San Antonio, Texas–Arlington, and New Mexico State. He was an interim head coach during the 2004-2005 season for NMSU as Lou Henson battled Non-Hodgkin lymphoma and compiled a 2–12 record. He was then hired at Cincinnati under Mick Cronin where he spent four seasons before serving as an assistant coach for Oregon until 2021.

DePaul
Stubblefield was hired on April 1, 2021 as the new head coach of the Blue Demons, replacing Dave Leitao.

Head coaching record

References

1970 births
Living people
African-American basketball coaches
American men's basketball coaches
American men's basketball players
Cincinnati Bearcats men's basketball coaches
Junior college men's basketball players in the United States
Omaha Mavericks men's basketball coaches
Omaha Mavericks men's basketball players
New Mexico State Aggies men's basketball coaches
Oregon Ducks men's basketball coaches
UT Arlington Mavericks men's basketball coaches
UTSA Roadrunners men's basketball coaches
DePaul Blue Demons men's basketball coaches
21st-century African-American sportspeople
20th-century African-American sportspeople